Montreal Center or Montréal Centre may refer to:

 Montreal Centre (federal riding)
 Montreal Centre (provincial electoral district)
 Downtown Montreal
 Montreal Area Control Centre